Vernaccia is the name of several or synonym of Italian wine grape varieties including:

Vernaccia, the white Tuscan grape used in the DOCG wine of Vernaccia di San Gimignano
Vernaccia, another name for Bianchetta Trevigiana that is a crossing of Durella and Brambana
Vernaccia, another name for Tintora that is a crossing of Aglianico and Gerusalemme
Vernaccia di Oristano, a white grape grown on the island of Sardinia
Vernaccia Trentina, also known as Vernaccia bianca, a virtually extinct variety that was once grown in the Trentino region
Vernaccia di Pergola, another name for the Aleatico grape in southern Italy
Vernaccia nera di Valdarno, a grape that is believed to be an offspring of Sangiovese
Vernaccia nera, another name for the Grenache grape in Marche and Umbria